is a Japanese actor. He has appeared in more than 30 films since 2007.

Selected filmography

Film

Television

Awards

References

External links
 Official Website 
 

1990 births
Living people
People from Ōtsu, Shiga
Japanese male film actors
Japanese male television actors
21st-century Japanese male actors